TNA Impact!: Cross the Line (stylized as TNA iMPACT!: Cross The Line) is a professional wrestling video game for the PlayStation Portable (PSP) and Nintendo DS consoles, released by SouthPeak Games in June 2010 The game is a port of TNA Impact!, a game originally developed by Midway Studios Los Angeles and Point of View, Inc., released by Midway Games in the fall of 2008. The PSP version is largely the same as the 2008 release, though the Nintendo DS version was specially configured by DoubleTap Games.

Development
On November 11, 2009, SouthPeak Games confirmed that it acquired Midway Games' TNA video game license in its quarterly report. The company would publish TNA Impact!: Cross the Line for PlayStation Portable and Nintendo DS, with it releasing in June 2010. The game was essentially the same as the TNA iMPACT! release, with the addition of several new characters such as Mick Foley and Consequences Creed, and the removal of older ones, such as Christian Cage, who departed the promotion in 2008.

Hulk Hogan made his TNA video game debut for the Nintendo DS version, though he is not available in the PlayStation Portable version.

Reception

The PSP version received "mixed" reviews according to the review aggregation website Metacritic. GameSpot wrote: "A wrestling game shouldn't be about wrestling with the controls." Some magazines gave mixed to unfavorable reviews months before the game was released Stateside.

See also

List of licensed wrestling video games

References

External links
 

2010 video games
Impact Wrestling video games
Nintendo DS games
PlayStation Portable games
Unreal Engine games
Video games using Havok
Video games developed in the United States
Single-player video games
SouthPeak Games